Nyu-zeki is an earthfill dam located in Chiba Prefecture in Japan. The dam is used for irrigation. The catchment area of the dam is 0.7 km2. The dam impounds about 2  ha of land when full and can store 146 thousand cubic meters of water. The construction of the dam was completed in 1940.

References

Dams in Chiba Prefecture
1940 establishments in Japan